Wittingen is a town in the district of Gifhorn, Lower Saxony, Germany.

Division of the town 
Wittingen consists of 27 districts:

History 
The earliest identified record of Wittingen appears in a document dated 781 which defines the territorial borders of the Bishopric of Hildesheim. Another early mention dates from 803 during the reign of Charlemagne, this time identifying the borders of the newly established Bishopric of Halberstadt. Neither of these sources pins down a date for the foundation of Wittingen, however.

During the Medieval period Wittingen was not merely a frontier point, but also a focus for traffic crossing into and out of the Altmark. The town was a trading point and an overnight stop for east-west commerce. Its significance was signaled in the ninth century when The Bishopric had the Church of St Stephen built. By the beginning of the thirteenth century Wittingen had been granted Town privileges, and was a part owner of the Lüneburg Mint. The fourteenth century was a period of political instability in this part of Europe and in 1340 ownership of Wittingen was transferred to the Welfs of Celle. Later, with the outbreak of the Hildesheim Diocesan Feud, the town was almost completely destroyed in 1519. Consequently, the building of town fortifications began shortly afterwards.

Demographic data 
Since the formation of the borough, the population grew steadily, both by natural population increase as well as immigration. 21.3% of the population in 2005 were under 18 years old, 7.1% from 18 to 25, 27.0% from 25 to 45, 24.4% from 45 to 64, and 20.3% were 65 years old or older. The unemployment rate stood at an average of 11.3% (men: 9.4%, women: 14.0%). 2,247 people commute regularly out of the town and 1745 into it daily.

Mayors

1974-1985: Robert Leipelt
1985-1989: Paul Degenhardt
1990-1991: Wilfried Wolter
1991-1996: Lothar Schoss
1996-2001: Günther Schulze
2001-2002: Hans-Jürgen Schindler
2002–2019: Karl Ridder (CDU)
since 2019: Andreas Ritter

Infrastructure

Health and medicine 
Wittingen has one hospital (Städtisches Krankenhaus), four pharmacies and six dentists.

Transport 

Wittingen is situated at the Brunswick-Uelzen railway and offers connections to Braunschweig.

Sons and daughters of the town

 Friedrich Spitta (1852-1924), theologian
 Bernd Fix (born 1962), computer specialist, member of the Chaos Computer Club
 Lars Nieberg (born 1963), jumping rider

Notable people
 Philipp Spitta (1801-1859), Lutheran theologian and poet, Superintendent in Wittingen 1847-1853
 Friedrich Spitta (1852-1924), German Protestant theologian, born in Wittingen, son of Philipp

Industry

The Privatbrauerei Wittingen produces with 100 employees 365 000 hectolitres of beer per year.

References

External links 

 www.wittingen.de 
 H. BUTTING GmbH & Co. KG

 
Towns in Lower Saxony
Gifhorn (district)